The 2020–21 North Florida Ospreys men's basketball team represented the University of North Florida in the 2020–21 NCAA Division I men's basketball season. The Ospreys, led by 12th-year head coach Matthew Driscoll, played their home games at the UNF Arena in Jacksonville, Florida as members of the Atlantic Sun Conference. They finished the season 8-15, 6-6 in ASUN Play to finish in 4th place. They lost in the quarterfinals of the ASUN tournament to North Alabama.

Previous season
The Ospreys finished the 2019–20 season 21–12, 13–3 in ASUN play to finish as ASUN regular season co-champions, alongside Liberty. After tiebreakers, they received the #2 seed in the ASUN tournament, where they defeated the #7 seed Jacksonville in the quarterfinals, 91–88, before falling to the #3 seed Lipscomb, in the semifinals, 71–73.

Roster

Schedule and results

|-
!colspan=12 style=| Non-conference regular season

|-
!colspan=12 style=| Atlantic Sun Conference regular season

|-
!colspan=12 style=| Atlantic Sun tournament
|-

|-

Source

References

North Florida Ospreys men's basketball seasons
North Florida Ospreys
North Florida Ospreys men's basketball
North Florida Ospreys men's basketball